Coptia is a genus of beetles in the family Carabidae, containing the following species:

 Coptia armata (Laporte de Castelnau, 1832)
 Coptia effeminata Darlington, 1934
 Coptia marginicollis Chaudoir, 1879
 Coptia sauricollis Darlington, 1934

References

Panagaeinae